Foundation of Bones is the second EP by Enterprise Earth. It is the band's first EP since 2014's XXIII. It is the first release from the band without founding guitarist BJ Sampson, the first release with new drummer Brandon Zackey, and the first release as a four-piece band.

Track listing

Personnel
Enterprise Earth
 Dan Watson – vocals
 Gabe Mangold – guitars
 Rob Saireh – bass
 Brandon Zackey – drums

References

2020 EPs
Deathcore EPs